Staraya Murtaza (İśke Mortaza) is a rural locality (a village) in Karacha-Yelginsky Selsoviet, Kushnarenkovsky District, Bashkortostan, Russia. The population was 133 as of 2010. There are 2 streets.

Geography 
Staraya Murtaza is located 30 km northwest of Kushnarenkovo (the district's administrative centre) by road. Tolbazy is the nearest rural locality.

References 

Rural localities in Kushnarenkovsky District